Words in Blue  (original title: Les Mots bleus) is a 2005 French drama film adapted from the novel  Leur histoire by French author Dominique Mainard. The film was adapted and directed by Alain Corneau.

Plot
Clara, (Sylvie Testud), works in a birdshop. She is concerned about  her deaf-mute daughter Anna, (Camille Gauthier),  whom she is bringing up on her own. She has never spoken a single word. Clara herself is illiterate. Ever since her grandmother Baba, whom she adored, had been the victim of an attack when she was reading her a story, she has always refused to learn to read and write. Now that the silence of her daughter Anna is causing her to be bullied by her peers,  Clara feels obliged to withdraw her from her school, and to enrol her in a school for the deaf-mute, run by Vincent, (Sergi López).  Vincent, the principal, suggests  giving his new pupil  particular classes to teach her Sign Language, and so facilitate Anna's integration.

Cast 
 Sylvie Testud as Clara 
 Sergi López as Vincent 
 Camille Gauthier as Anna 
 Mar Sodupe as Muriel 
 Cédric Chevalme as Clara's husband
 Isabelle Petit-Jacques as Anna's teacher
 Gabrielle Lopes Benites as Muriel's daughter
 Louis Pottier as Muriel's son
 Esther Gorintin as Baba 
 Clarisse Baffier as Young Clara

References

External links 
 

2005 films
French drama films
2000s French-language films
French Sign Language films
2005 drama films
Catalan-language films
Films about deaf people
Films based on French novels
Films directed by Alain Corneau
2000s French films